The 2015–16 Morgan State Bears men's basketball team represented Morgan State University during the 2015–16 NCAA Division I men's basketball season. The Bears, led by tenth year head coach Todd Bozeman, played their home games at the Talmadge L. Hill Field House and were members of the Mid-Eastern Athletic Conference. They finished the season 9–22, 6–10 in MEAC play to finish in a three way tie for ninth place. They defeated Maryland Eastern Shore in the first round of the MEAC tournament to advance to the quarterfinals where they lost to Hampton.

Roster

Schedule

|-
!colspan=9 style="background:#000080; color:#FF7F00;"| Regular season

|-
!colspan=9 style="background:#000080; color:#FF7F00;"| MEAC tournament

References

Morgan State Bears men's basketball seasons
Morgan State
Morgan
Morgan